RCBC Plaza is an office skyscraper complex located in Makati, Philippines. It is home to the offices of the Rizal Commercial Banking Corporation (RCBC) and is composed of two buildings: the taller RCBC Plaza Yuchengco Tower and the smaller RCBC Plaza Tower 2. At the time of its completion, the complex, as a whole, was considered by its developers to be the largest and most modern office development in the country.

Design and construction

The RCBC Plaza was designed by international architectural firm Skidmore, Owings & Merrill, LLP, in cooperation with local architectural firm W.V. Coscolluela & Associates. The structural design was provided by international engineering company Skilling Ward Magnusson Barkshire in cooperation with local engineering company R.S. Caparros Associates & Company. Project management services was provided by Bovis Lend Lease, while construction management works were provided by Pacific Orient Consultants & Management, Inc. The Main Contractor was ECW Joint Venture consisting of EEI Corporation (Philippines), Concrete Constructions (Australia) and Walter Bau (Germany). The superstructure construction works were self performed by ECW JV. EEI Corporation is also a part of the Yuchengco Group of Companies.

Besides these groups, other members of the design team include Ove Arup & Partners New York (Conceptual Services/Engineering/Transport & Traffic), DCCD Engineering Corp. (Electrical, Mechanical, Sanitary & Fire Protection Engineers); Davis Langdon & Seah (Quantity Surveyors); Hassell Ltd. (Landscape Consultants); ALT Cladding & Design (Cladding Consultants); Fisher Marantz Renfro Stone (Architectural and Theatre Lighting); and Shen Milsom & Wilke LLC . (Acoustical Consultants).

The external finishes of the buildings feature aluminum panels with fluorocarbon paint finish to towers, curtain wall of clear and solar reflective glass and stone cladding to podium.

Location

RCBC Plaza stands on an island site bounded by major thoroughfares in the Makati Central Business District. To its north runs Gil Puyat Avenue (Buendia) and to its west, Ayala Avenue. Around its area are the Glorietta Mall and Ayala Center, educational institutions like the Asian Institute of Management, the Ateneo Graduate School of Business, Ateneo Law School, Mapua Institute of Technology Makati Campus, Centro Escolar University Makati Campus, CEU School of Law and Jurisprudence and the Far Eastern University Makati Campus - Business School . It is also a few blocks away from deluxe hotels like Makati Shangri-La, The Peninsula Manila, Mandarin Oriental Manila, The InterContinental Hotel, Dusit Hotel plus the service facilities of the Makati Medical Center and the Central Post Office.

The RCBC Plaza is the home of Rizal Commercial Banking Corporation (RCBC), as well as the Yuchengco Institute for Advanced Studies (a partnership between RCBC and De La Salle University Professional Schools) and Yuchengco Museum.

It also houses the Carlos P. Romulo Auditorium, an auditorium with a capacity of 450 seats.

Features and amenities

The building complex features include perimeter located columns that offer a whole floor efficiency of 90% - 91%; floor to Ceiling height of 2.75 meters with provision for raised flooring; external Curtain Wall System facade; provision for Executive Toilet; Fiber Optic Telecommunication Backbone carrying telephone, data, security and building management signals; Fire Protection System with sprinklers, smoke detectors and pressurized stairwells; designated High Loading Zone; 100% emergency back-up power System; State-of-the-art invisible security system; central chiller-type Air-conditioning System; and digitally controlled and monitored Building Automation System.

Amenities of the complex include banking chambers; convenience and specialty shops; gymnasium and health spa; food court restaurant; open-air courtyard; and a chapel. Parking services are available with its 7-Level Basement that can accommodate up to 1,670 cars. De La Salle University also operates in RCBC Plaza offering professional and graduate programs including its Masters in Business Administration program.

See also 
 List of tallest buildings in Metro Manila

References

External links
RCBC Plaza official website
 RCBC Plaza Yuchengco Tower at Emporis
 RCBC Plaza Tower 2 at Emporis

Skyscrapers in Makati
Skyscraper office buildings in Metro Manila
Office buildings completed in 2001
Bank headquarters in the Philippines
Skidmore, Owings & Merrill buildings